Hakaharpalus is a genus of beetles in the family Carabidae, containing the following species:

 Hakaharpalus cavelli (Broun, 1893)
 Hakaharpalus davidsoni Larochelle & Lariviere, 2005
 Hakaharpalus maddisoni Larochelle & Lariviere, 2005
 Hakaharpalus patricki Larochelle & Lariviere, 2005
 Hakaharpalus rhodeae Larochelle & Lariviere, 2005

References

Harpalinae